James Brook is a stream in Middlesex County, in the U.S. state of Massachusetts. It is a tributary to the Nashua River.

James Brook was named after a local Indian.

References

Rivers of Middlesex County, Massachusetts
Rivers of Massachusetts